Upperthong is a village approximately  above sea level, near the town of Holmfirth in Holme Valley, approximately  south of Huddersfield, West Yorkshire, England.

History
The name Upperthong may derive from Old English 'uferra' (upper) + 'thwang' (narrow strip [of land]); since there is also a Netherthong, which is situated on lower ground than Upperthong, the names could designate lower and higher strips of land.

The village used to be in the wapentake of Agbrigg and Morley, and in the ancient ecclesiastical parish of Almondbury, but was transferred to the Holmfirth civil parish in 1921. For census purposes, the village is in the Holme Valley Parish, which at the 2011 census had a population of 27,146. In 2005, Kirklees Council stated that the population of Upperthong was 1,116; by 2019, the figure was 1,938.

Community

Village amenities include  the parish church of St John, a village hall, a cricket field, and a fish & chip restaurant and takeaway.

Upperthong is part of the Colne Valley constituency, which has been represented by Jason McCartney of the Conservative Party since the 2019 general election. The constituency was previously represented by Thelma Walker of the Labour Party.

Upperthong Junior and Infant School, of 198 children aged 4 to 11, in 2006 received an above average overall score in the key stage 1 and 2 league tables. The school received an overall rating of Grade 2 (Good), for all areas and overall effectiveness in its latest full Ofsted report of 2012, and achieved 'Good' again in 2017.

Several roads in Upperthong form part of the southern section of National Route 68 of the National Cycle Network – the Pennine Cycleway. The route follows Upperthong Lane from its start in Holmfirth, and continues north westwards through the village, and out over the moor to Meltham.

Upperthong has a cricket team in the Huddersfield Cricket League, and a football team who play in Division 4 of the Huddersfield and District Association League. The village holds the World Welly Wanging Championships each year at the Village Gala on the last weekend in June.

Two actors from the BBC comedy Last of the Summer Wine, Peter Sallis, and Bill Owen who played Compo, are buried at the parish church.

According to Streetlist.co.uk, Upperthong is equidistant from the cities of Leeds, Sheffield and Manchester, 19.1 miles (30.8 km) away.

References

External links 

 Official parish council site
 Upperthong Cricket Club
 Upperthong website
 St John's Parish Church

Geography of Kirklees
Villages in West Yorkshire
Towns and villages of the Peak District